was a Japanese decathlete. He competed in the men's decathlon at the 1928 Summer Olympics.

References

1904 births
1967 deaths
Sportspeople from Tokushima Prefecture
Japanese decathletes
Olympic decathletes
Olympic athletes of Japan
Athletes (track and field) at the 1928 Summer Olympics
Japan Championships in Athletics winners